Cameraria bethunella is a moth of the family Gracillariidae. It is known from Ontario and Quebec in Canada,  and Illinois, Kentucky, Connecticut, Maine, New York and Texas in the United States.

The wingspan is 6.5-7.5 mm.

The larvae feed on Castanea dentata and Quercus species, including Quercus ilicifolia, Quercus imbricaria, Quercus macrocarpa, Quercus obtusiloba, Quercus rubra, Quercus tinctoria and Quercus velutina. They mine the leaves of their host plant. The mine has the form of an irregular yellowish blotch mine on the upperside of the leaf. Pupation takes place in a flat, oval, silken cocoon.

References

Cameraria (moth)

Lepidoptera of the United States
Lepidoptera of Canada
Moths of North America
Taxa named by Vactor Tousey Chambers
Leaf miners
Moths described in 1871